Caenispirillum salinarum is a Gram-negative, Vibrio-shaped and motile bacterium from the genus of Caenispirillum which has been isolated from a solar saltern in Kakinada in India.

References

External links
Type strain of Caenispirillum salinarum at BacDive -  the Bacterial Diversity Metadatabase

 

Rhodospirillales
Bacteria described in 2012